The 2012 Purdue Boilermakers football team represented the Purdue University during the 2012 NCAA Division I FBS football season. The Boilermakers played in the Leaders Division of the Big Ten Conference and played their home games at Ross–Ade Stadium in West Lafayette, Indiana. The team was led by head coach Danny Hope, who was in his fourth season and was fired after the end of the regular season. The season finished with a won-loss record of 6–7 overall, 3–5 in Big 10 Leaders Division, finishing in 4th place.  The team was invited the 2013 Heart of Dallas Bowl, where they were defeated by Oklahoma State, 58-14.

Preseason
In 2011, the Boilermakers became bowl eligible in their twelfth game, and played in the 2011 Little Caesars Pizza Bowl against Western Michigan, defeating the Broncos 37–32.

Purdue returns fifteen out of twenty-two starters—eight on offense and seven on defense. Purdue will be forced to replace captains Offensive tackle Dennis Kelly, Linebacker Chris Carlino, as well as starters Defensive end Gerald Gooden Jr., Linebacker Joe Holland, Safety Albert Evans, Safety Logan Link Offensive tackle Nick Mondek, Kicker Carson Wiggs and Wide receiver Justin Siller, and key contributor Fullback Jared Crank. Several players left the Purdue program in 2012 for a variety of reasons. The most significant was Running back Reggie Pegram decided to transfer from the program following the bowl game. He ended up transferring to North Texas. Other's that left the program were running backs Doug Gentry and Devin Hill, kicker Ryan Ullrich and defensive tackle LaSalle Cooks.

Three Boilermakers were named to preseason watchlists. Raheem Mostert was named to the preseason Jet Award watch list, an award given to the top return specialist in the NCAA. Ricardo Allen was named to the preseason Jim Thorpe Award watchlist, an award given to the top defensive back in the NCAA. and Kawann Short was named to the preseason Lombardi Award watchlist, an award given to the top lineman in the NCAA. and Allen as well as Short have both been named to the Chuck Bednarik Award, which is given to the top defensive player in the NCAA.

Recruiting

Position key

Recruits

Schedule
The schedule is as follows:

Game summaries

vs. Eastern Kentucky

Sources: 
    
    
    
    
    
    
    
    

To open the season, Purdue hosted the Eastern Kentucky Colonels. This game was the first ever meeting between the two teams. This was coach Danny Hope's first ever game against a team of which he was formerly the head coach.

vs. Notre Dame

Sources:

Following its game against Eastern Kentucky, Purdue traveled to Notre Dame, IN and faced the Fighting Irish of Notre Dame. In the previous meeting, Notre Dame won 38–10.

vs. Eastern Michigan

Sources:

Following its game against Notre Dame, Purdue returned home to face the Eastern Michigan Eagles of the Mid-American Conference. In 1991, their most recent meeting, Purdue won 49–3.

vs. Marshall

Sources:

Following its game against Eastern Michigan, Purdue stayed home to face the Marshall Thundering Herd of Conference USA. This was the first ever meeting between the two schools in a football game.

vs. Michigan

Sources:

After its game against Marshall, Purdue hosted the visiting Michigan Wolverines to open Big Ten Conference play with an out of division game. In the previous meeting, Michigan defeated Purdue and won by a score of 36–14.

vs. Wisconsin

Sources:

After its game against Michigan, Purdue hosted the Wisconsin Badgers to open up Leaders Division play. In the previous meeting, Wisconsin dominated Purdue and won by a score of 62–17.

vs. Ohio State

Sources:

After its game against Wisconsin, Purdue traveled to Columbus to take on the Ohio State Buckeyes. In the previous meeting, Purdue upset Ohio State by a score of 26-23 in overtime.

vs. Minnesota

Sources:

After its game against Ohio State, Purdue traveled to Minneapolis, Minnesota to play the Minnesota Golden Gophers. In the previous meeting, Purdue defeated Minnesota by a score of 45-17.

vs. Penn State

Sources:

After its game against Minnesota, Purdue returned home to play the Penn State Nittany Lions. In last years meeting, Penn State defeated Purdue 23-18.

vs. Iowa

Sources: ESPN
    
    
    
    
    
    
    
    
    

After its game against Penn State, Purdue travels to Iowa City, Iowa to play the Iowa Hawkeyes. In last years meeting, Iowa defeated Purdue by a score of 31-21.

vs. Illinois

Sources: ESPN

After its game against Iowa, Purdue traveled to Champaign, Illinois to play the Illinois Fighting Illini. In last years meeting, Purdue defeated Illinois by a score of 21-14.

vs. Indiana

Sources: ESPN
    
    
    
    
    
    
    
    
    
    
    
    
    

After its game against Illinois, Purdue returned home to play the Indiana Hoosiers in the "Battle for the Old Oaken Bucket". In last years meeting, Purdue defeated Indiana by a score of 33-25.

vs. Oklahoma State

Roster

References

Purdue
Purdue Boilermakers football seasons
Purdue Boilermakers football